Crystal Beach is a neighbourhood in Ottawa, Ontario, Canada. It is located in the west end of Ottawa, in Bay Ward. The neighbourhood is triangular in shape, and its boundaries can broadly be described as Carling Avenue to the northeast, Moodie Drive to the west, and Corkstown Road to the south. It is. According to the Canada 2011 Census, the total population of the neighbourhood was 2,416.

History
Crystal Beach was established in the 1960s, when the area was within Nepean Township. Primarily developed by Minto Developments Inc., many of the residences in Crystal Beach are modified versions of the five original models of homes originally built in the neighbourhood. The neighbourhood was later extended in 1974 around Carling via Corkstown Road with townhomes and in 1988 with Maki Park. Some newer portions of the neighbourhood were built by Garand Homes. 

Today, Crystal Beach is a primarily residential neighbourhood with a strong sense of community, and over the years, has become one of the most desired real-estate locations in Ottawa. Much of Crystal Beach's appeal is due to its close proximity to the Nepean Sailing Club, Andrew Haydon Park, the Carling Campus and Ottawa River, its award-winning neighbourhood design (to reduce traffic flowing through), easy access to the Queensway (Highway 417), quality schooling, community centre, and the recreational facilities within.

Together with the Lakeview neighbourhood south of Corkstown,  and the Stonehedge and Creeks End neighbourhoods east of Holly Acres Road , the area is covered by the Crystal Beach Lakeview Community Association (CBLCA). The area north of Carling is the neighbourhood of Rocky Point, which is a partner of the CBLCA.

Schools
(schools within Crystal Beach boundaries)
 Lakeview Public School (Early French Immersion) JK to Grade 6
 Crystal Beach Public School for Special Education

(schools outside Crystal Beach, but which have Crystal Beach as a part of their catchment zone)

 Collège catholique Franco-Ouest (Grade 7 to 12)
 Our Lady of Peace Catholic Elementary, Bells Corners (JK to Grade 6)
 Bells Corners Public, Bells Corners (JK to Grade 6)
 St. Paul High School, 2675 Draper Avenue (Grades 7 and 8, Grades 9 to 12)
 Bell High School, Bells Corners (Grades 7 and 8, 9 to 12)community's high school

Parks
 Andrew Haydon Park
 Corkstown Park- Features tennis courts a swimming pool and small sledding hill in the winter.
 Maki Park - In the winter months, Maki Park has a full skating rink and 'puddle'. This facility is supervised, lit at night, has on-site washrooms available, and full hockey boards on the main surface.
 Lakeview Park - In the winter months, Lakeview Park has two ice surfaces, a full size ice rink for hockey and a separate sheet for skating. This outdoor ice surface has been sought after by NHL teams like the Florida Panthers.
 Winthrop Park
 Dick Bell Park - The Nepean Sailing Club is located in Dick Bell Park.

Transportation
Crystal Beach is a 15-minute drive from downtown, and about five minutes from Kanata. From this neighbourhood there are easy ways to access both the west end and centre of Ottawa, as Crystal Beach is served by two major arteries (Highway 417, Carling avenue).

Public transportation is provided by OC Transpo, with Route 58 as the primary route for the community as of 2021. Bayshore and Moodie station are within walking distance from certain parts of the community.

Adjacent neighbourhoods  
 Lakeview- Corkstown Road and Carling to the north, NCC Bike path to the west, Holly Acres Road to the east and Highway 417 to the south.
 Crystal Bay Established in early 1900s
 Rocky Point Established in early 1900s

References

External links
 Interactive Crime statistics for Crystal Beach

Neighbourhoods in Ottawa